The All India Muslim Students Federation (AIMSF) was an Indian Muslim students union affiliated with the All-India Muslim League. Splitting off from the All India Students' Federation in 1937, the body was organised under patronage of Muhammad Ali Jinnah in 1941 by his sister Fatima Jinnah and became an important part of the Pakistan Movement. Renowned Islamic scholar Dr Israr Ahmed was also the part of this Muslims Students Federation as a student of high school.

References

Further reading
 

Muslim League
Pakistan Movement
Student wings of political parties
Student organizations established in 1937
1937 establishments in British India